Braintree High School (BHS) is a four-year public secondary school located in Braintree, Massachusetts. The school is part of the Braintree Public School district and is situated on the northwest side of Sunset Lake at 128 Town Street.

General
Braintree's school colors are blue and white. The building is considered an example of Brutalist architecture. The old site of Braintree High School, located at the intersection of West Street and Washington Street, opened in 1927. The current site of Braintree High School, located adjacent to Sunset Lake, opened in 1972. As of the 2019–20 school year, the Principal of BHS is Christopher Scully.

Mascot
Braintree High School's mascot is the letter "B". Athletic teams from the school use the nickname "The Wamps." The name is derived from the Massachusetts Indian Chief known as Wampatuck, who ceded land to colonists through the "Braintree Indian Deed" in 1665.

Demographics

Athletics
Braintree High is a member of the Bay State Conference, a league in District C of the Massachusetts Interscholastic Athletic Association. They have traditional rivalries with Milton High School, including the annual football game on Thanksgiving Day, and Weymouth High School. Recently the Boys' Gymnastics squad has consistently repeated as champions of the BSC while the Cheerleading squad competes on the national stage. There have been several other state champions produced by BHS in the past several years, most notably in girls' athletics.  The Lady Wamps Basketball team won the state title for the 2005–06 fall season, while the Soccer team won in both 2005 and again in 2006. The boys ice hockey team made its first appearance in the Super 8 Ice Hockey Tournament in 2014, but lost to Catholic Memorial School in the play-in game, 2–1. In back-to-back years the Girls Basketball team won state championships in 2014 and went undefeated in 2015.
The Braintree High Dance Team has dominated conference and state championships for over a decade, including multiple New England championships.
The Varsity baseball team won the Super Eight baseball tournament in 2015, after previously losing to Newton North High School in 2014s final. The Wamps beat St. John's Preparatory School 7–3 after dropping the first game 20-4.

The name of the field that Braintree Baseball plays at is Veterans Stadium. The football team and occasionally the soccer and lacrosse teams play at an artificial turf field named Alumni Stadium. The Braintree High gymnasium is named H. Fred Hegret Gymnasium. The golf team plays its home events at Braintree Municipal Golf Course. The gymnastics room is named Shuhwerk Gymnastics Room. The Braintree Athletic Complex is a planned athletic complex that will be located at Braintree High School.

Notable alumni

 Amy Bishop, university shooter
 Kevin Buckley, former MLB player (Texas Rangers)
 Jim Calhoun, former coach of Connecticut Huskies men's basketball
 Mark Cusack, politician
 Bob Dee, former NFL player, Boston Patriots
 Chris Doherty, lead singer of the band Gang Green
 Peter Kormann, Olympic gymnast/Bronze medalist
 Boo Morcom, Olympic pole vaulter, masters world record holder
 Butch Stearns, WFXT-TV (Fox-25) Sports Anchor Sun-Thursday
 Joseph Sullivan, former mayor of the Town of Braintree
 Catherine Gizelis, lecturer

References

External links
 BHS profile provided by greatschools.net
 

Educational institutions established in 1858
1858 establishments in Massachusetts
Public high schools in Massachusetts
Bay State Conference
Education in Braintree, Massachusetts
Buildings and structures in Braintree, Massachusetts